Edward Barry Kelley (August 19, 1908 – June 5, 1991) was an American actor on Broadway in the 1930s and 1940s and in films during the 1940s, 1950s, and 1960s.  The heavy-set actor created the role of Ike in Oklahoma! on Broadway. His large size and acting range had him playing primarily judges, detectives, and police officers.

Early years
The 6'4", 230-pound Kelley was born in Chicago, Illinois, and attended the Goodman School of Drama at the Art Institute of Chicago (now at DePaul University).

Stage
Kelley began acting on the stage in the 1930s. His Broadway credits include Within the Gates (1934-1935), Parnell (1935-1936), Saint Joan (1936), Hamlet (1936-1937), The Wingless Victory (1936-1937), The Star-Wagon (1937-1938), Mamba's Daughters (1940), Strip for Action (1942-1943), Oklahoma (1943-1948), Loco (1946), Wonderful Journey (1946-1947) and Portrait in Black (1947).

Film
In films, Kelley often portrayed cops or judges in films, including Boomerang (his first film in 1947), Knock on Any Door, Ma and Pa Kettle, and The Asphalt Jungle. (Another source says, "His film debut was in the 1948 film noir Force of Evil.") One of his best roles (for which he received third billing) was as the good-bad half brother of Joel McCrea in The Tall Stranger (1957). Kelley had an uncredited role as a police chief in the 1964 Frank Sinatra musical Robin and the 7 Hoods.

Television
Kelley also appeared in dozens of television series.  As in the movies, he was usually in westerns or crime dramas.  In 1954 he appeared in a TV episode of The Lone Ranger entitled Texas Draw.

In 1959 Kelley appeared as Josh Teller on Lawman in the episode titled "The Outsider." He portrayed the recurring character Jim Rafferty in five episodes of the 1960–1961 situation comedy The Tom Ewell Show. In 1961 he appeared as Governor Johnson on the TV western Lawman in the episode titled "Owny O'Reilly."

In 1961, Kelley played Mr. Slocum, the boss of insurance agent Pete Porter, in six episodes of the CBS situation comedy, Pete and Gladys, starring Harry Morgan and Cara Williams. Also in 1961, he played "Danceman" in the episode "Everyman" in Have Gun-Will Travel, plus as villain Frank Williams in the episode "Ledger of Guilt" in Bat Masterson. Other western series he appeared in during this period included: Tales of Wells Fargo, Wanted: Dead or Alive, Laramie and Bronco.In 1962, Kelley played Captain Donovan in the episode "The Parish Car" of the ABC drama series, Going My Way, starring Gene Kelly. Kelley guest starred three times in the western television series Bonanza between 1959 and 1965, playing different roles. He played Judge Bryant in the episode "Trial at Tablerock" in Have Gun - Will Travel.  He also appeared occasionally as Alan Young's father-in-law on the situation comedy Mister Ed (1961–1966). In 1964 he portrayed Hurley Feasel in the episode "Kate Flat on Her Back" of the CBS sitcom Petticoat Junction; in the credits of that episode his last name was spelled "Kelly." In 1966 he played murderer Park Milgrave in the Perry Mason episode, "The Case of the Fanciful Frail." He portrayed a mayor on Rango in 1967 in the episode ""If You Can't Take It with You, Don't Go."

Kelley's last television role was as Sheriff Vic Crandall in three episodes of Petticoat Junction in 1967 and 1968.

Death
Kelley died in 1991 at the age of 82 in Woodland Hills, California.

Broadway roles

 Within the Gates (1934) as the gardener
 Parnell (1935) as first leader
 The Wingless Victory (1936) as Happy Penny
 The Star-Wagon (1937) as first thug

Selected filmography

 Boomerang (1947) - Desk Sgt. Dugan (uncredited)
 Force of Evil (1948) - Det. Egan
 Knock on Any Door (1949) - Judge Drake
 The Undercover Man (1949) - Attorney Edward J. O'Rourke
 Ma and Pa Kettle (1949) - Mr. Victor Tomkins
 Mr. Belvedere Goes to College (1949) - Police Sgt. Griggs
 Too Late for Tears (1949) - Police Lt. Breach
 Johnny Stool Pigeon (1949) - William McCandles
 Red, Hot and Blue (1949) - Lt. Gorman
 Fighting Man of the Plains (1949) - Slocum
 The File on Thelma Jordon (1950) - District Attorney Melvin Pierce
 Singing Guns (1950) - Mike Murphy
 Black Hand (1950) - Police Capt. Thompson
 Wabash Avenue (1950) - Sam - Bouncer
 The Capture (1950) - Mahoney
 Love That Brute (1950) - Burly Lieutenant
 The Asphalt Jungle (1950) - Lt. Ditrich
 711 Ocean Drive (1950) - Vince Walters
 The Killer That Stalked New York (1950) - Treasury Agent Johnson
 Right Cross (1950) - Allan Goff
 Southside 1-1000 (1950) - Bill Evans
 The Great Missouri Raid (1951) - Mr. Bauer
 Francis Goes to the Races (1951) - Roy Square Deal Mallory
 Flying Leathernecks (1951) - Brigadier General
 The Well (1951) - Sam Packard 
 Carrie (1952) - Slawson
 Woman of the North Country (1952) - O'Hara
 Back at the Front (1952) - Brig. Gen. Dixon
 Law and Order (1953) - Fin Elder
 Remains to Be Seen (1953) - Lt. O'Flair
 South Sea Woman (1953) - Col. Hickman
 Vice Squad (1953) - Dwight Foreman
 Champ for a Day (1953) - Tom Healy
 The Long Wait (1954) - Tucker
 The Shanghai Story (1954) - Ricki Dolmine
 Women's Prison (1955) - Warden Brock
 New York Confidential (1955) - Robert Frawley
 Trial (1955) - Jim Brackett
 Accused of Murder (1956) - Police Capt. Art Smedley
 The Wings of Eagles (1957) - Capt. Jock Clark
 Monkey on My Back (1957) - Big Ralph
 The Joker Is Wild (1957) - Captain Hugh McCarthy
 The Tall Stranger (1957) - Hardy Bishop
 Gunfire at Indian Gap (1957) - Sheriff Daniel Harris
 Buchanan Rides Alone (1958) - Lew Agry
 The Buccaneer (1958) - Commodore Patterson
 Ice Palace (1960) - Einer Wendt
 Elmer Gantry (1960) - Police Capt. Holt
 The Police Dog Story (1961) - Officer Bert Dana
 Secret of Deep Harbor (1961) - Milo Fowler
 The Clown and the Kid (1961) - Barker
 Jack the Giant Killer (1962) - Sigurd
 The Manchurian Candidate (1962) - Secretary of Defense
 Robin and the 7 Hoods (1964) - Police Chief Oscar C. Brockton (uncredited)
 Rio Conchos (1964) - Croupier
 How to Murder Your Wife (1965) - Club Member in Steam Room
 Boy, Did I Get a Wrong Number! (1966) - 'D.G.', Movie Studio Boss (uncredited)
 The Love Bug (1968) - Police Sgt.
 The Extraordinary Seaman'' (1969) - Adm. Barnwell (final film role)

References

External links

American male film actors
1908 births
1991 deaths
Male actors from Chicago
20th-century American male actors
American male stage actors
American male television actors
Western (genre) television actors